Dunfermline Athletic Football Club is a Scottish football club based in Dunfermline, Fife. The club first competed in a European competition in 1961–62, entering the UEFA Cup Winners' Cup. The club reached the quarter-finals on its first attempt. Their best run came in 1968–69 when they reached the semi-finals of the same competition.

Matches

Overall record

By competition

By country

Notes

References

Dunfermline Athletic F.C.
Dunfermline Athletic